Jack Donovan (1894–1981) was an American film actor. He was active in feature films and serials during the silent and early sound eras, playing a mixture of lead and supporting roles.

Selected filmography
 Milestones (1920)
 The Midlanders (1920)
 Hurricane's Gal (1922)
 The Spitfire (1924)
 Hoof Marks (1927)
 The Bullet Mark (1928)
 Captain Careless (1928)
 Twisted Rails (1934)
 Outlaw's Highway (1934)
 The Adventures of Frank Merriwell (1936, serial)

References

Bibliography 
 Jay Robert Nash, Robert Connelly & Stanley Ralph Ross. Motion Picture Guide Silent Film 1910-1936. Cinebooks, 1988.

External links 
 

1894 births
1981 deaths
American male film actors
Male actors from Chicago